A pubic piercing is a body piercing in the pubic area, on the mons pubis in females, or at the base of the penis in males. Healing times are at around 3–4 months. The rejection rate is around the same as well - that is, higher than most "conventional" (nose, ear, tongue) piercings, because it is a surface piercing. Some get this piercing because it can offer direct stimulation to the clitoris during intercourse. The placement is at the bottom of the pubic mound just above the penile shaft. Usually, the jewelry inserted is a custom-made surface bar, used to give the best chance of healing.

Healing
As with most piercings, the healing time varies depending upon depth of piercing and the level of activity that the piercee maintains. For a subject who has a healthy diet and low activity, a healing time of 10–12 weeks can be expected.

See also
Christina piercing

References

Further reading

Body piercing